José Patricio Carpio Guevara (born 19 October 1966) is an Ecuadorian football (soccer) referee, best known for having supervised several matches during the 2002 FIFA World Cup qualification in the CONMEBOL-zone. He also refereed at the Copa Libertadores (2006 and 2007).

References
Profile
worldfootball

1966 births
Living people
Ecuadorian football referees
Place of birth missing (living people)